East Fork Eagle River is an  tributary of the Eagle River in Eagle County, Colorado. The river flows from a source on Chicago Ridge in the White River National Forest to a confluence with the South Fork Eagle River that forms the Eagle River.

See also
 List of rivers of Colorado
 List of tributaries of the Colorado River

References

Rivers of Eagle County, Colorado
Rivers of Colorado
Tributaries of the Colorado River in Colorado